The Big Game is an annual rugby union match hosted by Harlequins during the Christmas holiday season each year. It is one of Harlequins' regular home matches in the Premiership Rugby but it is moved from their usual home ground at the Twickenham Stoop (14,816 capacity) to the much larger Twickenham Stadium (82,000 seats).

There have been other high-profile matches in London between Premiership Rugby clubs at other times, including the London Double Header (2004-2017), Bath's The Clash at Twickenham and Saracens'  games at Wembley Stadium, London Stadium and Tottenham Hotspur Stadium.

Since 2022 Harlequins have also hosted an additional match at Twickenham near the end of the season known as Big Summer Kick-off.

Big Game 1

Big Game 2

 Big Game 2 set a record Premiership attendance of 76,716.

Big Game 3

Big Game 4

 Going into the game Harlequins had won all of their Premiership games, but fell to defeat in this their eleventh game to the team second in the table.  As Twickenham had a capacity 82,000 crowd this game set a global rugby union attendance record for a regular-season club fixture.

Big Game 5

Big Game 6

Big Game 7

Big Game 8

Big Game 9

Big Game 10

Big Game 11

Big Game 12

Big Game 13

Pending developments with the COVID-19 pandemic, Big Game 13 was planned to be held in spring 2021. The game never came to fruition and Harlequins would instead return to Twickenham twice the following season.

Big Game 14

Harlequins intended to play Big Game 14 during the normal festive period. However, due to industrial action they were forced to play their festive fixture against Bristol Bears at Twickenham Stoop and would instead move their round 19 match against Exeter Chiefs to Twickenham. They would return to Twickenham the following month for their annual 'Big Summer Kick-Off' match

References 

Rugby union in the United Kingdom
Harlequin F.C.